The Hawaii State family courts are the family courts in the state court system of Hawaii

They have exclusive jurisdiction over cases involving legal minors, such as juvenile delinquency, status offenses, abuse and neglect, termination of parental rights, adoption, guardianships and detention among others. The family courts also oversee cases of domestic relations involving divorce, child support, and custody matters.

See also
 Courts of Hawaii

Hawaii state courts
Hawaii
Courts and tribunals with year of establishment missing